Dacus may refer to:

Dacus, a genus of tephritid or fruit flies in the family Tephritidae
Dacus, "Dacian" (adjectival form of Latin Dacia, ancient kingdom  in Central and South-Eastern Europe)
Dacus, "Dacian" (adjectival form of Latin Dacia, mediaeval Latin name for kingdom of Denmark)
Dacus, Latinised name of the mediaeval English Denys family, of Danish origin
Joseph A. Dacus, American author
Lucy Dacus, American indie rock singer and guitarist